Robert Morgan (born 1944) is an American poet, short story writer, and novelist.

Life
He studied at North Carolina State University as an engineering and mathematics major, transferred to the University of North Carolina at Chapel Hill as an English major, graduating in 1965, and completed an MFA degree at the University of North Carolina Greensboro in 1968.

He has taught at Cornell University since 1971, and was appointed Professor of English in 1984.

Awards
 Academy Award in Literature by the American Academy of Arts and Letters
 2008 Thomas Wolfe Prize
 2012 SIBA Book Award (nonfiction) for Lions of the West
 2013 William "Singing Billy" Walker Award for Lifetime Achievement in Southern Letters

Bibliography

Poetry 
Collections
Zirconia Poems. Northwood Narrows, New Hampshire: Lillabulero Press, 1969.

Red Owl. New York: Norton, 1972.

Trunk & Thicket. Fort Collins, Colorado: L’Epervier Press, 1978.
Groundwork. Frankfort, Kentucky: Gnomon Press, 1979.
Bronze Age. Emory, Virginia: Iron Mountain Press, 1981.
At the Edge of the Orchard Country. Middletown, Connecticut: Wesleyan University Press, 1987.

Green River: New and Selected Poems. Hanover, New Hampshire: University Press of New England, 1991.
Wild Peavines: New Poems. Frankfort, Kentucky: Gnomon Press, 1996.

List of poems

 "OPTION", The Atlantic, October 1997
 "Wind From a Waterfall", The Atlantic, September 1999
 "Girdling", The Atlantic, December 1997
 "Holy Cussing", Southern Poetry Review, Vol. 43, No. 1, 2004

Short fiction 
Collections

The Mountains Won’t Remember Us and Other Stories. Atlanta, Georgia: Peachtree Publishers, 1992.

Stories

Novels

Non-fiction
 Good Measure: Essays, Interviews and Notes on Poetry. Baton Rouge: Louisiana State University Press, 1993.
 Boone: A Biography, Algonquin Books of Chapel Hill, 2007, 
 Lions of the West - Heroes and Villains of the Westward Expansion, Shannon Ravenel Books, 2011,

References

External links
 "Author's website"
"Nostalgia May Not Be the Right Word," an Interview with Robert Morgan, Southern Spaces, December 11, 2013.

1944 births
Living people
20th-century American biographers
20th-century American essayists
20th-century American male writers
20th-century American novelists
20th-century American poets
20th-century American short story writers
21st-century American essayists
21st-century American male writers
21st-century American novelists
21st-century American poets
21st-century American short story writers
American male essayists
American male novelists
American male poets
American male short story writers
The Atlantic (magazine) people
Cornell University faculty
North Carolina State University people
Novelists from New York (state)
University of North Carolina at Chapel Hill alumni
University of North Carolina at Greensboro alumni
American male biographers